The least nighthawk (Chordeiles pusillus) is a species of nightjar in the family Caprimulgidae. It is found in Argentina, Bolivia, Brazil, Colombia, Guyana, Suriname, and Venezuela.

Taxonomy and systematics

Early in the 20th century the least nighthawk was assigned to its own genus, Nannochordeiles, but since the middle of the century has been included in Chordeiles. It has these six subspecies:

C. p. septentrionalis - Hellmayr (1908)
C. p. esmeraldae - Zimmer & Phelps (1947)
C. p. xerophilus - Dickerman (1988)
C. p. novaesi - Dickerman (1988)
C. p. saturatus - Pinto & Camargo (1957)
C. p. pucillis - Gould (1861)

Two specimens from northeastern Argentina might represent a seventh subspecies.

Description

Two females weighed  The general plumage pattern is brown upperparts with gray, rufous, and buff spots, and whitish or buff underparts with brown bars. The throat has a narrow white patch or small white patches on either side of it. The four outermost primaries have a white band that is highly visible in flight. Males also have white tips on some other wing feathers. The subspecies vary in size, colors, and the extent of the barring on the underparts.

Distribution and habitat

The six subspecies of least nighthawk are distributed thus. The subspecies of the two records in Argentina has not been determined.

C. p. septentrionalis, eastern Colombia through northern Venezuela and Guyana into western Suriname and northern Brazil
C. p. esmeraldae, southeastern Colombia, southern Venezuela, and extreme northwestern Brazil
C. p. xerophilus, Paraíba and Pernambuco states in extreme northeastern Brazil
C. p. novaesi, Maranhão and Piauí states in northeastern Brazil
C. p. saturatus, southeastern Amazonas, southwestern Pará, and western Mato Grosso states in west-central Brazil and extreme eastern Bolivia.
C. p. pucillis, Tocantins, Bahia, and Goiás states in eastern Brazil

The least nighthawk typically inhabits open savanna or subtropical grassland, both cerrado and caatinga.

Behavior

Movement

Some populations of least nighthawk appear to be migratory but the data are inconclusive.

Feeding

The least nighthawk is an aerial insectivore, taking prey of many insect orders. It hunts at dawn and late in dusk and tends to stay near the ground. It hunts in solitary, in pairs, or in small loose groups. Its flight has been described as "buoyant, quick, and erratic with many sudden shifts in direction".

Breeding

Very little is known about the least nighthawk's breeding phenology. Its nesting season appears to vary within its range. It lays one egg directly on the ground.

Vocalization

The least nighthawk's flight call has been variously described as "a low churr and a weak nasal beep or week" and as "a short, sharp whit or bit". It sings from the ground or a bush, "a fast cur-cur-cur-curry (or chu-chu-chu-chu-chuEE).

Status

The IUCN has assessed the least nighthawk as being of Least Concern. It has a wide distribution, its population is thought to be stable, and no threats have been identified.

References

least nighthawk
Birds of Brazil
Birds of Colombia
Birds of Venezuela
least nighthawk
Taxonomy articles created by Polbot